Karačić is a surname. Notable people with the surname include:

Branko Karačić (born 1960), Croatian retired footballer and football manager
Fran Karačić (born 1996), Croatian-Australian professional soccer player
Goran Karačić (born 1996), professional footballer from Bosnia and Herzegovina
Igor Karačić (born 1988), Croatian handball player
Ivan Karačić (born 1985), Bosnian handball player

See also 

 Karačić (Zavidovići), a village in Zavidovići municipality
 Karačići (disambiguation)

Croatian surnames